Neoraja is a genus of fish in the family Rajidae found in the Atlantic Ocean.

Species
 Neoraja africana (Stehmann & Séret, 1983) (West African pygmy skate)
 Neoraja caerulea (Stehmann, 1976) (Blue ray)
 Neoraja carolinensis McEachran & Stehmann, 1984 (Carolina pygmy skate)
 Neoraja iberica Stehmann, Séret, M. E. Costa & Baro, 2008 (Iberian pygmy skate)
 Neoraja stehmanni (Hulley, 1972) (African pygmy skate)

References 
 

 
Rajidae
Ray genera
Taxa named by Leonard Compagno
Taxonomy articles created by Polbot